Tordillo Mountain is a lone summit that rises to the elevation of  in Yuma County, Arizona.

History
Tordillo Mountain was a landmark along El Camino del Diablo that passed south of that peak.

References

History of Yuma County, Arizona
Mountains of Arizona
Mountains of Yuma County, Arizona